is a highway in Japan on the island of Kyūshū which runs from Saga City in Saga Prefecture to Nagasaki in Nagasaki Prefecture. It follows the old Nagasaki Kaidō, a road from the Edo period. About 10% of the route is 4 lanes or more, and the rest is two lanes.

Route data
Length: 136.5 km (84.8 mi)
Origin: Tosu (junction with Route 3)
Terminus: Nagasaki (terminates at Route 57 and Route 202)
Major cities: Saga, Takeo, Ōmura, Isahaya

Overlapping sections
From Saga City (Kokuritsubyōinmae intersection) to Ogi (Gojō intersection): Route 203
From Ogi (Maemitsue intersection) to Kōhoku (Higashibun intersection): Route 207
From Isahaya (Obunakoshi Tunnel intersection) to Isahaya Tarami-chō Keya: Route 207
From Isahaya (Obunakoshi Tunnel intersection) to Nagasaki (Kenchōmae intersection): Route 57
From Nagasaki (Yagamimachi intersection) to Nagasaki (Kenchōmae intersection): Route 251
From Nagasaki Ōhashi-chō (Iwayabashi intersection) to Nagasaki (Kenchōmae intersection): Route 206
From Nagasaki (Takara-chō intersection) to Nagasaki (Kenchōmae intersection): Route 202

Municipalities passed through
Saga Prefecture
Tosu - Miyaki - Kamimine - Yoshinogari - Kanzaki - Saga - Ogi - Kōhoku - Ōmachi - Takeo - Ureshino
Nagasaki Prefecture
Higashisonogi - Ōmura - Isahaya - Nagasaki

References

034
Roads in Nagasaki Prefecture
Roads in Saga Prefecture